Events from the year 1863 in Scotland.

Incumbents

Law officers 
 Lord Advocate – James Moncreiff
 Solicitor General for Scotland – George Young

Judiciary 
 Lord President of the Court of Session and Lord Justice General – Lord Colonsay
 Lord Justice Clerk – Lord Glenalmond

Events 
 10 January – steamer Bussorah is lost off Islay with all 33 hands on her maiden voyage.
 17 September – royal burgh of Linlithgow enters bankruptcy.
 18 September – Willie Park wins his second Open Championship title at Prestwick Golf Club.
 13 October – the Provostship of Aberdeen is elevated to Lord Provost.
 Overtoun House is completed.

Births 
 15 February – Charlotte Ainslie, educationalist and headmistress (died 1960)
 2 April – William Adamson, trade unionist and politician, leader of the Labour Party (1917–21) and Secretary of State for Scotland (1924 & 1929–31) (died 1936)
 17 May – Stewart Gray, lawyer, campaigner for social justice and patron of the arts (died 1937 in England)
 3 June – Neil Munro, writer (died 1930)
 1 September – Violet Jacob, born Violet Kennedy-Erskine, historical novelist and poet (died 1946)
 13 September – Arthur Henderson, first Labour Party cabinet minister and winner of the Nobel Peace Prize (died 1935 in England)
 5 December – George Pirie, painter (died 1946)

Deaths 
 3 July – Alexander Henry Rhind, antiquarian and Egyptologist (born 1833; died in Italy)
 14 August – Colin Campbell, army commander (born 1792; died in England)

The arts
 Uilleam Mac Dhun Lèibhe (William Livingston)'s Gaelic poem on the Clearances on his native Islay, Fios Thun A' Bhard, is published as a broadsheet in Glasgow.
 George MacDonald's novel David Elginbrod is published.

See also 
 Timeline of Scottish history
 1863 in the United Kingdom

References 

 
Years of the 19th century in Scotland
Scotland
1860s in Scotland